The 1940 Tampa Spartans football team was an American football team that represented the University of Tampa as a member of the Southern Intercollegiate Athletic Association during the 1940 college football season. In their eighth year under head coach Nash Higgins, the Spartans compiled an overall record of 3–6, with a mark of 2–4 in conference play, and finished 20th in the SIAA.

Schedule

References

Tampa
Tampa Spartans football seasons
Tampa Spartans football